Deadly Revisions is a 2013 horror thriller that was written and directed by Gregory Blair and is his directorial debut. The film stars Bill Oberst Jr. as a horror writer and filmmaker trying to figure out what caused a gap in his memory and why.

Synopsis
When horror writer and filmmaker Grafton Torn (Bill Oberst Jr.) wakes from a coma, he's horrified to find that he can't remember the events that led to his coma and leg injury. His physician has recommended that Grafton try to recover his memories by using hypnotherapy and medication while resting at a cabin in a peaceful location. Grafton agrees to this, but he finds that he's plagued by nightmares that involves not only the characters of his own creation but also potentially real memories. Things are made worse when these nightmares begin to spill over into his waking life, making Grafton question his very sanity.

Cast
Bill Oberst Jr. as Grafton Torn
Mikhail Blokh as Deter McMannus
Cindy Merrill as Ally Morris
Lise Hart as Kat Torn
Gregory Blair as Crawford Davis
Ronny Coleman as Doctor Myers
Shaun Gerardo as Ash
Dawna Lee Heising as Nurse Voorhees
Josh Patterson as Noose Man / Hatchet Man

Production
Plans to film Deadly Revisions were first announced in spring 2012. Initially titled Scare Tactics, the movie was intended to enter pre-production in 2012 and release the following year. The film's title was changed soon after the initial announcement, as the director wanted a title that reflected more upon the film's subject matter and could be seen as more "fresh". Filming took place in Los Angeles.

Reception
Horror Society said: "[Blair] has a flair for direction… "Deadly Revisions" is a well-made, tension filled thrill ride…" Dread Central said: "director Gregory Blair gives thinking-man’s thriller fans something to chew on." L.A. Horror.com declared the film "a freaky new thriller that will no doubt be a delight to the true horror viewer." Ain't It Cool News gave an overall favorable review for Deadly Revisions, praising Oberst's performance as Grafton Torn".

Awards
Best Picture (Deadly Revisions) - Matchflick.com Flicker Awards 
Best Narrative Feature (Deadly Revisions) - Los Angeles Film Awards 
Best Director of an Indie Horror Film (Deadly Revisions) - EOTM Awards
Best Screenplay (Deadly Revisions) - Terror Film Festival
Best Actor Bill Oberst Jr. - Fantastic Horror Film Festival 
Best Actress Cindy Merrill - Fantastic Horror Film Festival

References

External links
 
 

2013 horror films
2013 films
2013 directorial debut films
2010s English-language films